Sweet Sixteen is a 1983 American slasher film directed by Jim Sotos and starring Bo Hopkins, Susan Strasberg, Dana Kimmell, and Patrick Macnee. The film follows a teenage girl who moves to a small Texas town, after which a series of brutal murders plague the young men there. The film features Don Shanks, Steve Antin, Sharon Farrell, and Michael Pataki in supporting roles.

Plot 
In a small town in Texas, Native American Jason Longshadow is harassed by racist patrons of a local bar, spurring a physical altercation. As Jason leaves, fifteen-year-old Melissa Morgan, who has just moved there, arrives, having become lost. Jason warns her that she is in a seedy part of town, and urges her to leave. Locals Hank Burke and Johnny Franklin interrupt the conversation, and Johnny offers to give Melissa a ride home, leaving Hank to walk. Johnny takes Melissa to a rural location and the two begin to make out, but Melissa asks him to bring her home after he tells her they are at the site of an Indian burial ground. While parked outside Melissa's house, Melissa tells Johnny that they have moved there because her father, John, is an archeologist overseeing a local excavation of Native American artifacts, and that her mother, Joanne, was raised in the area. En route home, Johnny's truck breaks down. He begins walking, only to be stabbed to death by an unseen assailant.

Dan Burke, Hank's dad, who is also the local sheriff, gets a call from Billy Franklin, Johnny's drunkard older brother, about Johnny not having come home the night before. Dan takes Hank and his sister Marci to look for Johnny's truck. They soon locate it, and Marci stumbles upon Johnny's butchered corpse in a pile of underbrush. At school, Dan gets permission from Melissa's parents to question her about the events of the night before. Melissa recalls her encounter with Jason, who has coincidentally been hired to assist on John's archeological dig. Dan and John question Jason, but Jason explains that his conversation with Melissa was innocuous.

At school, Melissa meets Tommy Jackson, and they make plans to meet behind Earl's bar. While Tommy waits for Melissa, he is stabbed to death by the unseen assailant. Melissa arrives and is startled outside the bar by an elderly Native man, Greyfeather, causing her to knock over a stack of boxes, revealing Tommy's bloody corpse. Police arrive, and Melissa blames Greyfeather for Tommy's murder. Dan visits Greyfeather's home to question him, but finds him hanging in his house. Greyfeather's death is ruled a suicide, but Dan suspects he may have been murdered by local bigots. After Greyfeather's funeral, Marci confronts Melissa and blames her for his death, accusing her of lying. Marci swiftly feels remorseful for her harsh words, and the two eventually become friends.

John files a police report against Jason for theft, accusing him of stealing several knives from the archeological dig, causing suspicion to fall over Jason for the rash of killings. Dan goes to question Jason, but finds his house empty. In a trunk, Dan locates the blood-stained stolen knives, and Jason is arrested. With the help of Kathy Hopkins, a local archivist, Dan spends the evening researching the county records of murders committed in the area. While doing so, he learns that tests of the blood found on the knives is of animal origin, leading Dan to believe Jason is innocent. Meanwhile, Jason escapes the jail and goes to confront Jimmy and his friend, Billy, about Greyfeather's death.

Meanwhile, Joanne throws a barbecue that night to celebrate Melissa's sixteenth birthday, which both Hank and Marci attend. Melissa sneaks away with Hank to go skinny dipping at a lake, where they are spied upon by Jimmy and Billy. Jason stumbles on the scene and gets into a fight with the two men, resulting in Jason being knocked unconscious. Melissa witnesses this, and is attacked and sexually harassed by the drunk Jimmy and Billy. Hank attempts to rescue her, but is knocked out by Jimmy, before Billy also renders Melissa unconscious. Moments later, the unseen assailant stabs both Jimmy and Billy to death. Marci ventures into the woods to look for Melissa and Hank, and stumbles upon Jimmy and Billy's bodies. She subsequently finds Joanne in a catatonic state knelt over Melissa, who lay unconscious on the ground beside Hank. Joanne produces a butcher knife and aims to stab Marci, but stops when Dan arrives seconds later. It is revealed that Joanne is in fact Tricia, Joanne's deceased sister who committed suicide in a psychiatric hospital years prior following years of sexual abuse by their father. Tricia murdered their father to avenge Joanne's abuse, and assumed Joanne's identity after she died. Dan attempts to reason with the raving Tricia, but she kills herself by driving the knife through her own chest just as Melissa awakens.

Paramedics and police arrive at the Morgans' property to recover the bodies as the partygoers slowly scatter. Marci and Hank attempt to comfort a withdrawn Melissa outside. Melissa is impervious and slowly walks into her house alone in a daze. As she enters the front door, she brandishes a bloody knife, which she has concealed under the blanket wrapped around her.

Cast

Release 
The film was given a regional limited release theatrically in the United States by Century International, screening in Anniston, Alabama on January 28, 1983. The film opened in Biloxi, Mississippi on April 19, 1983, and on August 5, 1983 in Detroit, Michigan.

Critical response 
The Sacramento Bee critic George Williams panned the film as a "blood-spattered mess of a movie" that "boasts a cast of competent actors who must have been quite desperate to have agreed to appear in [it]." Bill Cosford of the Miami Herald praised the film's cast, but noted the subplot involving anti-Native American prejudice as "wholly gratuitous."

In a review for eFilmCritic, Dr. Isaksson gave the film a positive review with much of his praise going towards the lead performances stating, "Ever like a film just because of the cast involved and the overall set up, no matter how ridiculous? This is my love/hate relationship with 1982's Sweet 16. I am a fan of the underground actor (who has been in a few aboveground movies) Steve Antin, (Jonathan Antin's much more endearing and talented brother). And good lord, I cannot express or explain how much I fancy the slasher ingenue Dana Kimmell. It was the beautiful brunette's co-starring role in this horror film that became the catalyst for her being cast by director Steve Miner for the epic 3D installment of the Jason cut em ups, Friday the 13th Part III. One look at Ms. Kimmell and he knew he had his replacement for Amy Steel. So certainly it comes as no shocker that in Sweet 16 Dana shows off some serious screaming ability and for this film, it was a handy talent. Now, all this being stated, I am not hinting that these above mentioned horror films are really anything more than pure drivel but damn, what a nice looking spot of drool it is."

Home media 
A director's cut of the film was released on DVD in the United States by Code Red in 2008. Code Red also issued a limited Blu-ray release in the United States on August 11, 2015.

References

External links 
 
 
 

1983 films
1983 horror films
American slasher films
1980s slasher films
1980s English-language films
Films about racism
Films directed by Jim Sotos
Patricide in fiction
Incest in film
Native American cemeteries in popular culture
1980s American films